Wivina  (1103–1168) was a Benedictine abbess. Born in Oisy, France, she refused all offers of marriage, becoming, aged 23, a hermitess at Groot-Bijgaarden, near Brussels. She later accepted land from Count Godfrey of Brabant and built a convent and served as its first abbess.

References

1103 births
1168 deaths
12th-century Christian saints
Belgian Roman Catholic saints
Benedictine nuns
Female saints of medieval Belgium
French Roman Catholic saints
People from Dilbeek
Medieval Belgian saints
Medieval French saints
Female saints of medieval France
12th-century French nuns
Belgian hermits
12th-century women of the Holy Roman Empire